Elonka may refer to:

Elonka Dunin (b. 1958), American game developer and author of books and articles on cryptography
Stephen Michael Elonka (d. 1983), author of numerous technical books, and creator of the fictional engineer Marmaduke Surfaceblow
 Elonka, aboriginal name for Marsdenia australis, an Australian fruit and the associated totem

See also
 Ilonka (disambiguation)